William Taylor (born 27 July 1944), is an English retired senior Circuit Judge for the City of Plymouth.

Career
Taylor was called to the bar by the Inner Temple in 1968. He became a Circuit Judge in 1989 at the age of 44, the second youngest of his generation.

In June 1979, Taylor defended Maria Kristina Coppel, a 23 year old Swedish medical student, who had been arrested for attempting to smuggle drugs into the UK on behalf of Guru Bhagwan Shree Rajneesh. The technique of brainwashing her and other female followers of the sect, which emerged during the court proceedings, ultimately led to the Guru's expulsion from India. Coppel received a suspended sentence.

Taylor was counsel for Nicholas Price, who was jailed for life for the murder of his three-year-old stepdaughter, Heidi Koseda, who starved to death in a locked room in Hillingdon, West London in 1984. The case prompted an overhaul of child care services after an independent inquiry criticized the National Society for the Prevention of Cruelty to Children for failing to act.

In 1986, Taylor was counsel for the defence during the trial of gangster-turned-state witness Francesco Di Carlo, the former head of the Mafia's British operations.

Another defendant he represented, Anton Johnson, was charged with stealing money from Southend United F.C., of which he was Chairman. Johnson was acquitted despite the prosecution calling Bobby Moore, former captain of England's World Cup side of 1966.

Taylor also defended Barry Terry, a senior Customs Officer charged with corruption and the smuggling of gold coins into the UK.

Taylor presided over the trial of Britain's most prolific paedophile, William Goad, at Plymouth Crown Court.  Taylor sentenced Goad to life imprisonment for two charges of indecent assault and 14 counts of rape. From 2004-2015, Taylor was patron of "12s Company", a charity specialising in the counselling of victims of sexual abuse, particularly those of William Goad.

On 31 July 1998, Taylor sentenced a number of unnamed defendants to a total of 100 years imprisonment for the serial sexual abuse of their children and grandchildren over a 35-year period. The case was described as being akin to the high profile case of Fred West and Rosemary West.

Taylor is currently Chairman of the Board of Trustees at Hamoaze House in Plymouth, a day treatment centre for those addicted to drugs and/or alcohol.

Taylor is also President of the Devon Safer Communities Trust (DSCT), a charity which raises funds to provide activity programmes designed to keep vulnerable children off the streets.

In 2004, Taylor was appointed the Honorary Recorder of Plymouth by the City Council for life, in recognition of his long-standing fight against drugs and his campaign for a safer city, and he continues to play a significant role in the City's activities as its second citizen.

In 2005, Taylor was awarded an Honorary Doctorate, Doctor of Laws, by the University of Plymouth.

Taylor retired from the Bench in 2006 on health grounds.

In July 2014, in his role as Chairman of Plymouth University, Taylor suspended Wendy Purcell, the University's vice-chancellor, following complaints about her conduct. Wendy Purcell ceased employment at Plymouth University from December 31, 2015.

He stepped down from the University Board in September 2014.

References 

Circuit judges (England and Wales)
People from Plymouth, Devon
People associated with the University of Plymouth
1944 births
Living people